The Generations Project is a reality television series produced by and shown on BYU Television that helps those who have questions about their family history investigate their own identities by embarking on a journey to uncover the lives and stories of their ancestors. During this journey each participant attempts to retrace their ancestors footsteps often participating in immersion experiences, meeting experts, and even sometimes connecting with family they never knew they had. As each participant on the show sets out on their journey they discover new details about the lives of their ancestors, answer questions about identity, about time and place, and even discover things about themselves. Overall this journey helps participants learn where they have been and make their own conclusions about where they are going. It premiered on January 4, 2010.  the show is in its third season, with a total 33 shows produced.

Episodes

Season 1: 2010

References

External links

BYU Broadcasting program page
Twitter page

Brigham Young University
2010 American television series debuts
2010s American reality television series
Family history
2012 American television series endings